Vadavedampatti is a village that is located in Tamil Nadu, southern part of India. This village is located at Kamanaicken Palayam in Coimbatore. Majority of people speaks Tamil. In olden days this place was called as Uttiraserimaampuri. Mariamman temple is famous. The primary profession of this village is farming.
More temples are available than the schools.
President of the Village Thirumathi Santhamani Viswanathan

History 
In ancient days this village was called as Uththira Serimaampuri.

The meaning of the ancient village name based on dictionary word is the following,

Basic Amenities 

Following facilities as per the year 2015

Small villages 

Vadavedampatti village panchayat consists of the following small villages

 Karumpuravipalayam
 Vadavedampatti

Basic details 

Postal code of Vadavedampatti is 641671

Temples and festivals 
Vadavedampatti's major temple festival is Mariamman Temple Festival, that is celebrated each year last week or prior to last week of Tamil month Puraṭṭāsi.

Vadavedampatti Mariamman temple festival is celebrated as a 3 days festival.

Day 2 -  (அலகு குத்துதல்),  (பூ ஓடு எடுத்தல்).

Day 3 -  (மஞ்சள் நீராட்டு).

Part of this is the Ther procession that carries 'Ther Thiruvizha' pulled by people that consider it an honor.

Villages in Coimbatore district